The Beypore Lighthouse is a lighthouse at Feroke, Kozhikode, on the south shore of the Chaliyam River. The tower is painted with red and white bands. The lighthouse started functioning on 21 November 1977. The light source is metal halide lamp.

See also 

 List of lighthouses in India

References

External links 
 

Lighthouses in Kerala
Buildings and structures in Kozhikode district
Transport in Kozhikode district
Lighthouses completed in 1977
1977 establishments in Kerala